11th FAI World Rally Flying Championship took place between September 4–12, 1999 in Ravenna in Italy.

There were 48 crews from 16 countries: Poland (5), South Africa (5), Italy (5), France (4), Czech Republic (4), Slovakia (4), Austria (4), Germany (4), United Kingdom (2), Greece (2), Russia (2), Spain (2), Chile (2), Republic of Macedonia (2), Slovenia (1), Cyprus (1).

Contest
First navigation competition:
 Nigel Hopkins / Dale de Klerk  - 96 penal points
 Janusz Darocha / Zbigniew Chrząszcz  - 102 pts
 Krzysztof Wieczorek / Wacław Wieczorek  - 124 pts

Second navigation competition:
 Włodzimierz Skalik / Ryszard Michalski  - 166 pts
 Jiři Jakes / Lubomir Šťovíček  - 106 pts
 Janusz Darocha / Zbigniew Chrząszcz  - 120 pts

Third navigation competition:

 Krzysztof Wieczorek / Wacław Wieczorek  - 4 pts
 Jerzy Markiewicz / Dariusz Zawłocki  - 65 pts
 Joël Tremblet / Jose Bertanier  - 71 pts

Results

Individual (10 best)

Team
Two best crews were counted (number of penal points):

 - 678
 - 1268 
 - 1541 
 - 2178
 - 2554
 - 2570 
 - 3459
 - 3972
 - 4752 
 - 6629  
 - 9198 
 - 9295 
 - 9876
 - 11952  
 - 12740

Trivia
All five Polish crews took places in the best ten.

External links
11th FAI World Rally Flying Championship

Rally Flying 11
Fédération Aéronautique Internationale
September 1999 events in Europe
1999 in Italy
Ravenna
Aviation history of Italy